Susan Codd Trew (born 1853) was an English composer, pianist, and teacher who is best remembered today for her Sonata for Violin and Piano.

Trew studied at the London Academy of Music, where she was awarded a gold medal. She married organist and composer Charles Abraham Trew in 1880. In 1882 they had a son, Arthur Charles Trew, who also became a composer.

Trew's music was published by E. Ashdown, Boosey & Co., Landy & Co., and Schott Music. Some of it is available at the British Library. Her works include:

Violin and Piano 

Allegretto Grazioso
Barcarolle
Bluette
Cavatina
Lullaby
Melody
Romance
Sonata
Two Morceaux Faciles
Valse Mignonne

Voice 

"Shadow Town" (text by L.D. Rice)

References 

British women composers
English composers
1853 births
Alumni of the London Academy of Music and Dramatic Art
Violin sonatas
Year of death missing